Love and the Turning Year: One Hundred More Poems from the Chinese is a collection of translations of Chinese poetry by Kenneth Rexroth, first published in 1970. The book contains poetry translations from the Han Dynasty on, including a section with a number of anonymous Six Dynasties poems. As is the case with his earlier book One Hundred Poems From the Chinese, Rexroth's Love and the Turning Year: One Hundred More Poems from the Chinese actually contains somewhat more than one-hundred poems.

See also
Classical Chinese poetry

Notes

References
Rexroth, Kenneth, 1970. Love and the Turning Year: One Hundred More Poems from the Chinese. New York: New Directions.

Chinese poetry collections
1970 poetry books